Sex verification in sports (also known as gender verification, or loosely as gender determination or a sex test) occurs because eligibility of athletes to compete is restricted whenever sporting events are limited to a single sex, which is generally the case, as well as when events are limited to mixed-sex teams of defined composition (e.g., most pairs events). Practice has varied tremendously over time, across borders and by competitive level. Issues have arisen multiple times in the Olympic games and other high-profile sporting competitions, for example allegations that certain male athletes attempted to compete as women or that certain female athletes had intersex conditions perceived to give unfair advantage. Sex verification is not typically conducted on athletes competing in the male category.

The first mandatory sex test issued by the International Association of Athletics Federations (IAAF), the world's track and field governing body, for woman athletes was in July 1950 in the month before the European Championships in Belgium. All athletes were tested in their own countries. Sex testing at the actual games began with the 1966 European Athletics Championships’ response to suspicion that several of the best women athletes from the Soviet Union and Eastern Europe were actually men. At the Olympics, testing was introduced in 1968. In some cases, these policies have led to athletes undergoing unnecessary surgery such as female genital mutilation and sterilization. Subsequent reports have shown that the tests could cause psychological harm. Sex verification—identifying athletes whose hormone levels are abnormal compared to others of their purported sex — can cause sex identity crises, elicit demeaning reactions (publicly and privately), isolate athletes socially, and lead to depression and sometimes suicide.

History
Sex verification in sports began in the 1940s with "femininity certificates" provided by a physician. It subsequently evolved into visual inspections, physical examinations, chromosome testing, and later testosterone level testing. These tests were all designed to ensure that athletes were only allowed to compete as their sex, but mostly resulted in the exclusion of intersex athletes. It is not always simply checking whether a person's sex chromosome pair is XX vs. XY, or comparing their levels of key sex hormones to distinct reference ranges, to determine an athlete's sex. Variations in pairings of inherited chromosome, other genetic aspects, and pre- and postnatal physical development at subcellular to organ levels mean some people are not unambiguously female or male. Fetuses start out as undifferentiated, then the SRY gene (which is usually—but not always—located on the Y chromosome) turns on a variety of hormones that differentiate by the time of birth the newborn as a male baby. But sometimes this differentiation does not occur while other times the SRY gene is located on a different chromosome: People with two X chromosomes can develop hormonally or phenotypically as a male; and people with an X and a Y can develop hormonally or phenotypically as a female.

Physical examinations

United States Olympic Committee president Avery Brundage requested, during or shortly after the 1936 Summer Olympics in Berlin, that a system be established to examine female athletes.  According to a Time magazine article about hermaphrodites, Brundage felt the need to clarify "sex ambiguities" after observing the performance of Czechoslovak runner and jumper Zdeňka Koubková and English shotputter and javelin thrower Mary Edith Louise Weston.  Both individuals later had gender reassignment surgery and legally changed their names, to Zdeněk Koubek and Mark Weston, respectively.

Sex verification tests began in 1950 with the International Association of Athletics Federations (IAAF), using physical examinations.  "Sex segregation and verification are mutually interdependent because, if there were no claims or basis for having separate male and female sporting events, there would be no need for sex verification testing." The Dutch athlete Foekje Dillema was banned for life in July 1950. The International Olympic Committee followed suit in 1968. Initially, women athletes "were asked to parade nude before a panel of doctors". For a period of time these tests were mandatory for female athletes, due to fears that male athletes would pose as female athletes and have an unfair advantage over their competitors.

Chromosome testing
Chromosome testing was introduced by the International Olympic Committee during the 1968 Summer Olympics. This tested for the Y-chromosome, and was designed to identify males potentially disguised as females. This method of testing was later abolished, as it was shown to be inconclusive in identifying maleness.

The International Association of Athletics Federations ceased sex screening for all athletes in 1992, but retained the option of assessing the sex of a participant should suspicions arise. A resolution was passed at the 1996 International Olympic Committee (IOC) World Conference on Women and Health "to discontinue the current process of gender verification during the Olympic Games". The International Olympic Committee's board voted to discontinue the practice in June 1999. Chromosome testing was last performed at the Atlanta Olympic Games in 1996.

Hormone testing 

In August 2009, South African athlete Caster Semenya was subjected to mandatory sex verification testing at the request of the IAAF. In the wake of the Semenya case, testosterone testing was introduced to identify cases where testosterone levels were elevated above a particular level, termed hyperandrogenism, with national Olympics committees tasked by the IOC to "actively investigate any perceived deviation in sex characteristics".

In football, FIFA's current gender verification policy dates to 30 May 2011. In June 2012, in advance of the 2012 Summer Olympics, the IOC released IOC Regulations on Female Hyperandrogenism to address these cases. It includes the statement, "Nothing in these Regulations is intended to make any determination of sex. Instead, these Regulations are designed to identify circumstances in which a particular athlete will not be eligible (by reason of hormonal characteristics) to participate in 2012 Olympic Games (OG) Competitions in the female category. In the event that the athlete has been declared ineligible to compete in the female category, the athlete may be eligible to compete as a male athlete, if the athlete qualifies for the male event of the sport."

Policies on hyperandrogenism were suspended following the case of Dutee Chand v. Athletics Federation of India (AFI) & The International Association of Athletics Federations, in the Court of Arbitration for Sport, decided in July 2015. Chand had been dropped from the 2014 Commonwealth Games at the last minute after the Athletic Federation of India stated that hyperandrogenism made her ineligible to compete as a female athlete. The ruling found that there was insufficient evidence that testosterone increased female athletic performance. In doing so the court immediately suspended the practice of hyperandrogenism regulation used by the IAAF and declared it void unless the organization could present better evidence by July 2017.

A study published in 2017 by Stéphane Bermon and Pierre-Yves Garnier analyzed 2,127 performances and hormone concentrations in male and female elite track and field athletes during the 2011 and 2013 Track and Field World Championships. When compared with women with lower levels of the hormone free testosterone (fT), women with the highest fT levels performed significantly better in the 400 m, 400 m hurdles, 800 m, hammer throw, and pole vault with margins of 2.73%, 2.78%, 1.78%, 4.53%, and 2.94%, respectively. Such a pattern was not found in any of the male athletic events. The study concluded that female athletes with high testosterone levels have a significant competitive advantage over those with low fT in 400 m, 400 m hurdles, 800 m, hammer throw, and pole vault.

Scholars question whether any advantage should be considered “unfair” if it occurs naturally and outside the control of the athlete. For example, elite athletes have greater aerobic capacity and endurance in comparison to the general population. Furthermore, these cases have elicited criticism of the elite sporting system by showing clear vulnerability of women athletes to unnecessary medical interventions under duress, applied even though there was no evidence of cheating and no evidence of athletic advantage.

As with previous forms of sex testing, testosterone testing has been regarded by many as humiliating, unnecessary and discriminatory. Katrina Karkazis, Rebecca Jordan-Young, Georgiann Davis and Silvia Camporesi argued that the new IAAF policies on hyperandrogenism in female athletes will not protect against breaches of privacy, will require athletes to undergo unnecessary treatment in order to compete, and will intensify "gender policing". In fact, high-performing female athletes show a rate of Complete Androgen Insensitivity Syndrome much higher than the general population—which shows 1 in 20,000–50,000, compared with elite athletes’ 1 in 429. They recommend that athletes be able to compete in accordance with their legal gender.

In November 2015, the IOC held a meeting to address both its hyperandrogenism and transgender policies. In regards to hyperandrogenism in female athletes, the IOC encouraged reinstatement of the IAAF policies suspended by the Court of Arbitration for Sport. It also repeated an earlier policy statement that, to "avoid discrimination, if not eligible for female competition the athlete should be eligible to compete in male competition". In February 2016, it was made known that the IOC would not introduce its own policies that would impose a maximum testosterone level for the 2016 Summer Olympics. On November 1 of 2018 the IAAF adopted new criteria regarding "Differences of Sexual Development" for female athletes competing in the following races: 400 m, 800 m, 1 mile, hurdles, and events that include a combination of these distances. Athletes with testosterone levels equalling or exceeding 5 nmol/L or who are "androgen sensitive" and want to participate in above-mentioned events at the global level (including recognition for setting an international record) must legally be female or intersex, must get their testosterone levels below 5nmol/L for six consecutive months and must ensure their levels stay below this level. This new regulation replaced all previous rules implemented regarding women with Hyperandrogenism. 

In April 2016, the United Nations Special Rapporteur on health, Dainius Pūras, criticized current and historic sex verification policies, describing how "a number of athletes have undergone gonadectomy (removal of reproductive organs) and partial cliteroidectomy in the absence of symptoms or health issues warranting those procedures".

The cases of Dutee Chand and Caster Semenya were widely reported during the 2016 Rio Olympics. Immediately preceding the games, Genel, Simpson and de la Chapelle were again published in Journal of the American Medical Association stating:

Sex verification of men
Sex verification is not conducted on athletes competing in the male category, and little data are available on their chromosomes or hormone profiles. However, a post-competition study of 693 elite athletes by Healy et al., published in 2014, found significant differences along many variables. The authors found that:

Using these data, Scientific American estimated that "almost 2 percent" of male competitors had testosterone levels in the typical female range. The study authors also stated that average lean body mass differences might account for performance differences between sexes.

20th century

 Perhaps the earliest known case is that of Stanisława Walasiewicz (aka Stella Walsh), a Polish athlete who won a gold medal in the women's 100 m at the 1932 Summer Olympics in Los Angeles, but who after her death in 1980 was discovered to have had partially developed male genitalia.
 Before the advent of sexual verification tests, German athlete Dora Ratjen competed in the 1936 Olympic Games in Berlin and placed fourth in the women's high jump.  Ratjen later competed and set a world record for the women's high jump at the 1938 European Championships before tests by the German police concluded that Ratjen was a man. Ratjen was likely an intersex individual, based on the physician's description who conducted the examination. Though raised as a girl, Ratjen later took the name Heinrich Ratjen following an official registry change.
 The Dutch sprinter Foekje Dillema was expelled from the 1950 national team after she refused a mandatory sex test in July 1950; later investigations revealed a Y-chromosome in her body cells, and the analysis showed that she probably was a 46,XX/46,XY mosaic female.
 Sisters Tamara and Irina Press won five track and field Olympic gold medals for the Soviet Union and set 26 world records in the 1960s. They ended their careers before the introduction of gender testing in 1966. Although both sisters were accused of being men or hermaphrodites, there is no evidence of an intersex condition in these cases.
 Polish athlete Ewa Kłobukowska, who won the gold medal in women's 4 × 100 m relay and the bronze medal in women's 100 m sprint at the 1964 Summer Olympics in Tokyo, is the first athlete to fail a gender test in 1967. She was found to have the rare genetic condition of XX/XXY mosaicism and was banned from competing in Olympic and professional sports.
 In 1967 the IOC disqualified the Austrian 1966 female world champion in downhill skiing, Erik Schinegger (then named Erika), from the 1968 Winter Games in Grenoble after determining Schinegger had internal male sex organs. Schinegger later transitioned to male.
 In 1986, Spanish hurdler Maria José Martínez-Patiño was dismissed and publicly shamed after failing a chromosomal test. She fought the ruling against her, arguing that she could not have a competitive advantage because her intersex variation resulted in her having no functional testosterone. Two years later, the IAAF gave Martínez-Patiño the green light to compete again. Her plight brought attention to the issue of gender testing, which helped lead to the end of mandatory tests a decade later.

21st century

 In 2001, Indian athlete and swimmer Pratima Gaonkar committed suicide after disclosure and public commentary on her failed sex verification test.
Indian middle-distance runner Santhi Soundarajan, who won the silver medal in 800 m at the 2006 Asian Games in Doha, Qatar, failed the sex verification test and subsequently stripped of her medal.
South African middle-distance runner Caster Semenya won the 800 meters at the 2009 World Championships in Athletics in Berlin. After her victory at the 2009 World Championships, it was announced that she had been subjected to gender testing. The IAAF confirmed that Semenya had agreed to a sex-testing process that began in South Africa and would continue in Germany. On 6 July 2010, the IAAF confirmed that Semenya was cleared to continue competing as a woman. The results of the gender testing were never officially released for privacy reasons. In 2018, the IAAF announced new rules that once again prevented Semenya from running, rules that are thought to have been designed specifically to target Semenya.
 In 2012, after female Indian track athlete Pinki Pramanik was accused by a female roommate of rape and later charged, she was gender tested and declared a male although she and other medical experts dispute the claims. Pramanik disagreed with these results and police ordered a separate government-led test as part of the trial. The SSKM Government Hospital declared the results to be inconclusive. The Court then directed a chromosome pattern test.
 Four unnamed women athletes from developing countries were subjected to gonadectomies (a form of sterilization) and female genital mutilation as part of a process to enable them to compete. The female athletes were discovered to have an intersex trait during testosterone testing; the case was first published in 2013.
Dutee Chand was dropped from the 2014 Commonwealth Games at the last minute after the Athletic Federation of India stated that hyperandrogenism made her ineligible to compete as a female athlete. Chand took a case to the Court of Arbitration for Sport and won an interim judgment in mid-2015. In February 2016, it was made known that the IOC would not impose a maximum testosterone level for the 2016 Summer Olympics. In June 2016, Chand qualified to compete in the 100 metres race at the Summer Olympics. Notably, all three medalists in the women's 800 m were intersex, despite intersex people allegedly making up only 1% of the population (intersex testing is not common, true population ratios of intersex individuals are unknown); the 4th, 5th, and 6th placers expressed disappointment and concern.
 In 2019, World Athletics opted to set a maximum testosterone level for the 400, 800, and one-mile women's races in the 2020 Summer Olympics.  Caster Semenya, an intersex woman who won gold in the women's 800 m in both the 2012 and 2016 Olympics, filed to appeal the decision, which would effectively ban her from competing in middle distance races due to hyperandrogenism. She subsequently attempted to compete in the women's 5k, but failed to qualify by the June deadline.

Transgender athletes

In November 2015, the IOC held a meeting to address both its transgender and hyperandrogenism policies. In regard to transgender athletes it stated that transgender athletes cannot be excluded from an opportunity to participate in sporting competition. Transgender athletes who identified themselves as female would be allowed to compete in that category as long as their testosterone levels were below 10 nanomoles per litre for at least 12 months prior to the competition. There would be no restrictions on transgender athletes who identify and compete as male. In 2019, the IAAF lowered the maximum level to 5 nmol/L. 

 Professional tennis player Renée Richards, a transgender woman, was barred from playing as a woman at the 1976 US Open unless she submitted to chromosome testing. She sued the United States Tennis Association and in 1977 won the right to play as a woman without submitting to testing.

Sex verification

Chromosome testing 

The practice of chromosome testing came under scrutiny from those who feel that the testing was humiliating, socially insensitive, and neither accurate nor effective. The testing is especially difficult for people who could be considered intersex. Genetic differences can allow a person to have a male genetic make-up and female anatomy or body chemistry. In the Journal of the American Medical Association, Simpson, Ljungqvist and others stated,

Hormone testing 
Women with higher levels of androgen (particularly testosterone) are often considered to have a competitive advantage over other women since women statistically have lower levels than men. This difference in androgen levels is the reason many sports requiring athletes compete only among their own sex. However, others argue that expecting women athletes with naturally higher levels of testosterone to lower these levels by medical/pharmaceutical methods completely contradicts the purpose of doping regulations, which require athletes to not take any substances that their bodies do not generate naturally.

In January 2010 in Miami, instead of succeeding in improving the policies specifying whether an athlete should participate as a woman or a male, medical professionals experienced ambiguity in regards to these policies. Alice Dreger states it is risky to publicly reveal that an athlete is no longer allowed to compete as a woman without first informing the athlete. For example, Caster Semenya found out through public media that the tests she had taken were meant to determine whether she is female or male. Another athlete, Santhi Soundarjan, had a suicide attempt subsequent to failing the test for determining her gender and being stripped of her 2016 Asian Games medal.

A scholar questions whether men with androgen levels similar to those of women will be permitted to participate in the women's category or instead be granted the opportunity to increase their androgen levels to those of other males. This is the logical and fair result how policies using functional testosterone to decide eligibility to compete as a female or a male work for women. Males with Klinefelter Syndrome/XXY chromosomes are in this position but nonetheless usually cannot compete while utilizing testosterone because of their medical situation. In the Semenya case the fact that they found high testosterone levels and were going back and forth on her gender verification affected her mental health. By contradicting her sex they were violating laws by international and national genetic privacy laws. Gender verification impacts numerous dimensions of athletes' lives, including unfair disqualification in sporting events, identity crisis and confusion, social isolation, depression, and suicide.

Transgender athletes 
Transgender athletes who wish to compete in the female category are allowed to do so if their testosterone levels are in accordance with the required levels. However, the IOC stated that requiring surgical anatomical changes as a requirement for participation may be considered a violation of human rights. Athletics may for some transgender people engage them within greater society in affirming ways. However, others opposed the participation of transgender athletes on women's teams state that the argument is unsound. Athletes who have faced opposition include Mianne Bagger, Martine Delaney (who participated in "Soccer Tasmanian's women's league") and Lana Lawless.

Hormone Testing in Post Secondary Education 

In 2011, the NCAA made a statement of inclusivity for Transgender athletes competing in college athletics. Through this statement, the NCAA was able to structure an implementation plan for transgender athletes to participate in college sports, and some policies that would ensure an equitable opportunity for every athlete. The following are the specific guidelines for transgender athletes incorporated into the NCAA in 2011:1. A trans male (FTM) student-athlete who has received a medical exception for treatment with testosterone for diagnosed Gender Identity Disorder or gender dysphoria and/or Transsexualism, for purposes of NCAA competition may compete on a men’s team, but is no longer eligible to compete on a women’s team without changing that team status to a mixed team. 

2. A trans female (MTF) student-athlete being treated with testosterone suppression medication for Gender Identity Disorder or gender dysphoria and/or Transsexualism, for the purposes of NCAA competition may continue to compete on a men’s team but may not compete on a women’s team without changing it to a mixed team status until completing one calendar year of testosterone suppression treatment.In 2021, however, the NCAA adjusted the previous policy of requiring one calendar year of testosterone suppressing therapy for transgender female athletes. Instead, now there is more frequent testosterone testing. The following passage describes these additional requirements:Starting with the 2022-23 academic year, transgender student-athletes will need documented levels at the beginning of their season and a second documentation six months after the first. They will also need documented testosterone levels four weeks before championship selections. Full implementation would begin with the 2023-24 academic year.More frequent hormone testing is seen in the IOC policy for sex verification. The motives behind these new implementations, according to the NCAA, is so that there is “consistency and further strengthens the relationship between college sports and U.S. Olympics”

Overall, the topic and policies of transgender athletes in post secondary sports is highly controversial. The amount of open transgender athletes competing in college athletics in the United States is extremely small, as only 32 athletes are reportedly transgender. But some of these specific examples grab the public’s attention.

See also 
 Gender
 Intersex human rights
 Sexual differentiation
 Transgender people in sports
 Testosterone regulations in women's athletics
 List of intersex Olympians
 LGBT issues at the Olympic and Paralympic Games

Notes

References